Jonathan Trey Brubaker (born November 17, 1993) is an American professional baseball pitcher for the Pittsburgh Pirates of Major League Baseball (MLB). He made his MLB debut in 2020.

Early life and amateur career
Brubaker attended Tecumseh High School in New Carlisle, Ohio, and the University of Akron, where he played college baseball for the Akron Zips. In 2015, his junior year, he had a 5–4 win-loss record with a 3.63 earned run average (ERA) over 15 games started. He was drafted by the Pittsburgh Pirates in the sixth round of the 2015 Major League Baseball draft.

Professional career
Brubaker signed with Pittsburgh and made his professional debut that season with the West Virginia Black Bears, compiling a 6–4 record with a 2.82 ERA over 15 starts. In 2016, he played for the West Virginia Power and the Bradenton Marauders where he pitched to a combined 6–11 record with a 4.44 ERA in 26 starts between the two clubs, and in 2017, he pitched with the Altoona Curve, going 7–6 with a 4.44 ERA in 26 games (24 starts).

Brubaker began 2018 with Altoona and was promoted to the Indianapolis Indians in May. In 28 starts between both teams, he went 10–6 with a 2.81 ERA and a 1.26 WHIP. After the season, the Pirates named Brubaker their minor league pitcher of the year. The Pirates added him to their 40-man roster after the season. He returned to Indianapolis to begin 2019, but appeared in only six games during the season due to injury. 

Brubaker made the Opening Day roster in 2020 and made his major league debut on July 26, pitching 2 scoreless innings against the St. Louis Cardinals. He finished the shortened 2020 season with a 1–3 record, a 4.94 ERA and 48 strikeouts in  innings. In 2021, he went 5–13 with a 5.36 ERA and 129 strikeouts in  innings over 24 starts.

On January 13, 2023, Brubaker agreed to a one-year, $2.275 million contract with the Pirates, avoiding salary arbitration.

References

External links

1993 births
Living people
Sportspeople from Springfield, Ohio
Baseball players from Ohio
Major League Baseball pitchers
Pittsburgh Pirates players
Akron Zips baseball players
West Virginia Black Bears players
West Virginia Power players
Bradenton Marauders players
Altoona Curve players
Glendale Desert Dogs players
Indianapolis Indians players